is a Japanese professional baseball infielder. He last played for the Chunichi Dragons in Japan's Nippon Professional Baseball.

Early career
As a 6 year old, playing catch with an Akinobu Okada signed ball was his inspiration to start playing baseball where he played for Edogawa South Little Seniors.
At Shutoku High School, he played mostly as a pitcher with time spent at short stop where he was the ace and batted 4th. In summer of his junior year he reached the best 8 of the Tokyo tournament while in spring of his senior year he reached the Tokyo tournament semi-finals where he also hit a home run in the second game against Meisei High School. 
In summer of his senior year he showed great poise in pitching against Kanto Daiichi High School in the tournament final. He also hit a come from behind RBI in the 7th inning. In the 8th inning however due to leg discomfort, he came off the mound where his team went down in a walkoff loss, missing his chance at reaching the Japanese High School Baseball Championship. He hit a total of 18 homeruns in his high school career.

On 28 October 2010, Mitsumata was selected as the 2nd draft pick for the Orix Buffaloes at the 2010 NPB draft and on 21 November signed a provisional contract with a ¥60,000,000 sign-on bonus and a ¥6,000,000 yearly salary.

Professional career

Orix Buffaloes

2011
In his first year with the Buffloes, Mitsumata played in 103 Western League games with a .225 average where he led the league in errors. He also appeared in the 2011 Fresh All Stars Game.

2012
Mitsumata once again played the majority of games on the farm playing in 86 games and hitting .220. On August 7, he was brought up to the first team for the first time and made his debut on the following day. On the 14th of the same month, he was removed from the first team but was re-added in September where on the 22nd in a game against the Chiba Lotte Marines he hit his first professional hit against Takahiro Fujioka in what would turn out to be a multi-hit game. He then hit in 4 consecutive games. He ended the season having played 9 games batting .238.

2013
Mitsumata made limited appearances as a pinch runner or defensive substitution where he played 21 games batting .100.

2014
On 29 July, it was announced that Mitumata was to be traded to the Chunichi Dragons in a 1-to-1 trade with Kyohei Iwasaki.

Chunichi Dragons

2014
Mitsumata made his Chunichi Dragons debut against the Tokyo Yakult Swallows on 17 August. He later would play against the Hanshin Tigers at Koshien Stadium where he would hit his first professional homerun off of Suguru Iwazaki.

2015
Mitsumata made one first team appearance as a pinch runner and was demoted from the team.

2016
Playing in 15 games batting .125 Mitsumata was once again unable to prove his ability to perform in the top squad and was subsequently demoted once more.

2017
Mitsumata played 68 games batting .227 on the farm team. He would play 8 games for the first team with a single plate appearance.

2018
Mitsumata played 90 games batting .176 in the Western League. He failed to make any first-team appearances. His salary was therefore slashed by ¥1,000,000 to ¥6,000,000 per annum.

Playing Style
As a pitcher he was able to throw 149 km/h with a slider. In a practice game in high school he showed off his power hitting a 120-metre homerun off future teammate Shohei Tsukahara where he also showed off his strong arm.

References

External links

NPB.jp

1992 births
Living people
People from Katsushika
Baseball people from Tokyo
Japanese baseball players
Nippon Professional Baseball infielders
Chunichi Dragons players
Orix Buffaloes players
Tokyo Yakult Swallows players